Communications on electronic trading platforms are based on a list of well-defined protocols.

Although FIX protocol has grown significant market share, the exchange specific protocols (also called "Native" interfaces) have found a strong backing with people using low latency trading.

Protocols used by electronic exchanges
List of Electronic Exchanges along with the protocols they currently expose as their E-Trading interface.

Americas

Europe

Asia

References 

Electronic trading platforms
Financial markets
Futures markets
Derivatives (finance)
electronic trading protocols
Financial industry XML-based standards
Financial metadata
Electronic trading